San Joaquin City (Spanish: San Joaquín, meaning "St. Joachim") is a former settlement in San Joaquin County, California. It was established in 1849, during the California Gold Rush. It was located on the west bank of the San Joaquin River just below the point where Airport Way (formerly Durham Ferry Road) crosses the river today.  It was an important settlement along the old River Road (now Kasson Road in San Joaquin County) between Banta and Grayson's Ferry (now the community of Grayson in Stanislaus County.

History

San Joaquin City was a river town established in 1849, on high ground by the San Joaquin River.  Pioneers and freight wagons following post roads to the Southern Mines crossed the San Joaquin River nearby at Durham's Ferry, and as the crossroads point for riverboat and overland traffic, the town played an important part in development of the west side of San Joaquin Valley grain farming and cattle raising.  It became a popular trading outpost, and was said to be a rival to nearby Stockton.

In 1879, the Central Pacific Railroad opened rail service from Martinez to Fresno, reducing the importance of river traffic to the western Central Valley. Before the turn of the 20th century, the upstream portion of the San Joaquin River was increasingly being diverted for irrigation, making the river downstream less navigable.  By the 1890s, the land the city was situated on was being bought by private individuals and returned to farm use.  Finally, flooding in 1911 cut new channels for the river, making its navigation almost impossible to maintain, and was considered to be "the final blow to the hopes and aspirations of San Joaquin City."

The San Joaquin City post office, the first post office in the area, opened in 1851; it closed in 1852, and reopened in 1874.

The site of the former city is located on Kasson Road, in Tracy, California.

Historical Landmark plaque
It is marked by California Historical Landmark 777, placed in 1962.  The original fifty-pound bronze plaque was reported stolen in October 2005.

By August 2017, the plaque had been replaced by a wooden plaque with a paper copy of the original bronze plaque attached to it.  The paper plaque read:

Site of San Joaquin City

A hand-written inscription at the bottom of the plaque read: "Replaced by Jim Dorroh 8-17-17"

In February 2020, a new aluminum plaque was installed, with minor changes to the wording.

References

Further reading
  Published in six parts (some of which are referenced in the article): 
 Part 1 (PDF). Vol IX no. 2. April 1973. Archived from the original (PDF) on 2019-03-26.
 Part 2 (PDF). Vol IX no. 3. July 1973. Archived from the original (PDF) on 2019-03-26.
 Part 3 (PDF). Vol IX no. 4. October 1973. Archived from the original (PDF) on 2019-03-26.
 Part 4 (PDF). Vol X no. 1. January 1974. Archived from the original (PDF) on 2019-03-26.
 Part 5 (PDF). Vol X no. 2. April 1974. Archived from the original (PDF) on 2019-03-26.
 Part 6 (PDF). Vol X no. 3. July 1974. Archived from the original (PDF) on 2019-03-26.

External links
 Site of San Joaquin City - California Historical Markers on Waymarking.com

Ghost towns in California
Former settlements in San Joaquin County, California